Cavell Nurses' Trust is a charitable organisation which supports the welfare of nurses, midwives and healthcare assistants in the United Kingdom. It was founded in 1917 in the memory of British nurse Edith Cavell.

Benevolent fund
, Its objective is "to help the UK's 650,000 nurses, midwives and health care assistants, both working and retired, who are in need of support due to ill health, injury, financial difficulties and domestic abuse." In the five-year period before 2011, the fund provided thousands of nurses with support that totalled more than £2.5million. In 2015, more than 1,400 people received support from the trust.

History
Edith Cavell was executed in 1915 during the First World War by a German firing squad. A year after her death The Lancet published a letter from her sister, who wrote to say Edith "had long cherished the idea of establishing homes of rest for nurses." An appeal was set up, with the Edith Cavell Homes of Rest for Nurses registered as a war charity. By July 1918 Queen Alexandra had become the patron. The Daily Telegraph and the Daily Mirror launched a national appeal for funds in her memory. The appeal by the newspapers raised £12,500. By 1919, an Edith Cavell Home of Rest in Richmond was up and running. In 1921, administration of the Edith Cavell Homes of Rest for Nurses transferred to Nation's Fund for Nurses.

In October 2012 NurseAid rebranded to Cavell Nurses' Trust, changing their name and new logo to place more emphasis on their link with Edith Cavell. The trust is registered with the Charity Commission for England and Wales as the Edith Cavell Fund For Nurses.

Recent campaigns

In 2011 the trust launched student scholarship awards, offering five bursaries of up to £2,000 each.

In 2013 the trust supported a campaign against domestic violence, then a Birmingham campaign against illegal money lenders and legal high interest lenders.

In 2014 the trust were awarded a grant of £91,900 from the Heritage Lottery Fund to tell the story of Edith Cavell during the centenary year of her death (2015).

In 2015 they ran a campaign called Moment of thanks where they invited patients and their families to share their stories.

In December 2015 their campaign raised awareness of those nurses who are living in fuel poverty.

In October 2016, the Trust released a report into the levels of hardship and domestic abuse faced by nursing professionals entitled Skint, shaken, yet still caring.

References

External links
 

Nursing organisations in the United Kingdom
1917 establishments in the United Kingdom